Lovre Brečić (born 16 August 1996) is a Croatian taekwondo athlete. He won the gold medal at the 2018 European Taekwondo Championships on the bantamweight (-63 kg) category.

He won one of the bronze medals in the men's 68 kg event at the 2022 Mediterranean Games held in Oran, Algeria.

References

External links 

 

1996 births
Croatian male taekwondo practitioners
Living people
Sportspeople from Split, Croatia
Universiade medalists in taekwondo
Universiade bronze medalists for Croatia
European Taekwondo Championships medalists
Medalists at the 2017 Summer Universiade
Competitors at the 2022 Mediterranean Games
Mediterranean Games bronze medalists for Croatia
Mediterranean Games medalists in taekwondo
21st-century Croatian people